The 2021 Hawthorn Football Club season was the club's 97th season in the Australian Football League and 120th overall, the 22nd season playing home games at the Melbourne Cricket Ground, the 21st season playing home games at the University of Tasmania Stadium, the 17th season under head coach Alastair Clarkson, and the 1st season with Ben McEvoy as captain.

On 6 July 2021, Hawthorn announced that former premiership captain and current assistant coach Sam Mitchell would succeed Clarkson as coach when his contract expired following the 2022 season. However, just a few weeks later the club announced that Clarkson would instead depart at the end of the 2021 season. Clarkson will depart the club as the most decorated coach in club history, having coached the most games (home and away, finals, total), wins (home and away, finals, total), and premierships. Following the announcement, Hawthorn finished the season strongly with wins over premiership contenders, Brisbane, and the Western Bulldogs. They also defeated Collingwood, and draw with the two–time defending premiers Richmond.

Hawthorn improved on their 5–12 record from the previous season. Hawthorn finished in 14th place with a 7–13–2 record. For the first and only time under Alastair Clarkson, the club failed to qualify for finals for the third consecutive season. Luke Breust topped the club goalkicking for the third time, finishing the season with 33 goals. Tom Mitchell won his third Peter Crimmins Medal.

Club summary 
The 2021 AFL season was the 125th season of the VFL/AFL competition since its inception in 1897; having entered the competition in 1925, it was the 97th season contested by the Hawthorn Football Club. Tasmania, iiNet, and Nissan continued as the club's three major sponsors, as they have done since 2006, 2013, and 2019 respectively, while Adidas continued to manufacture the club's on-and-off field apparel, as they have done since 2013. Hawthorn continued its alignment with the Box Hill Hawks Football Club in the Victorian Football League, allowing Hawthorn-listed players to play with the Box Hill Hawks when not selected in AFL matches.

Senior personnel 
 On 23 September 2020, Forwards coach Scott Burns departed the club after three–seasons to join Adelaide as a senior assistant coach.
 On 9 October 2020, Head of matchday strategy and opposition coach, Adem Yze departed Hawthorn after nine–seasons spent in various roles and joined Melbourne as an assistant coach. The club Yze had spent his entire playing career.
 On 17 October 2020, it was announced that Craig McRae would join the club as an assistant coach. McRae was previously an assistant coach with Richmond, and had been a part of the club's 2017, 2019, and 2020 premierships. McRae had also coached Richmond's VFL team to a premiership in 2019 and was named VFL coach of the year for the 2019 season.
 On 29 October 2020, the coaching lineup for the 2021 season was announced with numerous line coach changes due to the ongoing effects of COVID-19. After spending 2020 as the midfield coach, Sam Mitchell moved into a development while also being placed in the role of head coach of the club's VFL affiliate Box Hill Hawks. Chris Newman will take over as backline coach. Craig McRae will be in charge of the forward line filling the vacancy left by Scott Burns. Brendon Bolton will become the midfield coach, after spending the 2020 season as the director of coaching.
 On 16 January 2021, Graham Wright departed the club after 14 years. Two days later it was confirmed that Wright joined Collingwood as the general manager of football. Rob McCartney was announced as the new Head of Football on 10 February 2021.
 On 29 January 2021, Ben McEvoy was appointed the 45th captain of Hawthorn since joining the VFA in 1914 and 37th since joining the VFL in 1925. Jaeger O'Meara remains in his role of vice-captain which he has held since 2020. Tom Mitchell, Jack Gunston, Liam Shiels remained a part of the leadership group alongside new addition James Worpel.

Playing list changes

Trades

Free agency

Departures

Draft

AFL draft

Rookie draft

Mid-season rookie draft 
The Mid-season draft will take place during Hawthorns bye week. Hawthorn will have two selections due to Jonathon Pattons retirement and James Sicily being placed on the long-term injury list.

Retirements and delistings

2021 player squad

Community series

Home & Away season

Ladder

Statistics

Awards, records and milestones

Awards
AFL awards
 22 Under 22 team: Changkuoth Jiath

Club awards
 Peter Crimmins Medal: Tom Mitchell
 Best clubman: Ben McEvoy
 Most consistent player: Sam Frost
 Most promising player: Changkuoth Jiath
 Best first year player (debut season): Jacob Koschitzke

Club records 
 Most tackles: 1,387 – Liam Shiels
 Most goal assists: 209 – Luke Breust
Most score involvements: 1,474 – Luke Breust
 Most games coached: 390 – Alastair Clarkson
 Most victories coached: 228 – Alastair Clarkson
 Most home and away games coached: 364 – Alastair Clarkson
 Most home and away victories coached: 212 – Alastair Clarkson
 Most uncontested disposals in a season: 504 – Tom Mitchell

Milestones
Round 1
 Tyler Brockman – AFL debut.
 Connor Downie – AFL debut.
 Kyle Hartigan – Hawthorn debut.
 Jacob Koschitzke – AFL debut.
 Tom Phillips – Hawthorn debut.
 Tyler Brockman – 1st AFL goal.
 Tom Phillips – 1st goal for Hawthorn.

Round 2
 James Worpel – 50th AFL game.
 Jacob Koschitzke – 1st AFL goal.

Round 4
 Jarman Impey – 50th game for Hawthorn.
 Michael Hartley – 1st goal for Hawthorn.

Round 6
 Jack Scrimshaw – 1st AFL goal.

Round 7
 Emerson Jeka – AFL debut.

Round 8
 Alastair Clarkson – 350th Home and Away game coached.
 Harry Morrison – 50th AFL game.

Round 10
 Ned Reeves – AFL debut.

Round 11
 Tom Phillips – 100th AFL game.
 Damon Greaves – 1st AFL goal.
 Ned Reeves – 1st AFL goal.

Round 13
 Tom Phillips – 50th AFL goal.
 Jai Newcombe – AFL debut.

Round 14
 Lachlan Bramble – AFL debut.

Round 15
 Denver Grainger-Barras – AFL debut.
 Jai Newcombe – 1st AFL goal.

Round 16
 Shaun Burgoyne – 400th AFL game.

Round 17
 Emerson Jeka – 1st AFL goal.

Round 20
 Ben McEvoy – 150th game for Hawthorn.

Round 21
 Blake Hardwick – 100th AFL game.

Round 22
 Jonathon Ceglar – 100th AFL game.
 Ben McEvoy – 100th AFL goal.
 Lachlan Bramble – 1st AFL goal.

Round 23
 Shaun Burgoyne – 250th game for Hawthorn.
 Tom Mitchell – 150th AFL game.

References 

Hawthorn Football Club Season, 2021
Hawthorn Football Club seasons